The Virgin Gorda League was a regional association football league played in Virgin Gorda, British Virgin Islands. In 2009 the league disbanded after the merger with the Tortola League to create a new top league, the BVIFA National League.

Previous Winners
1996: Spice United
1997: Beverly Hills
1998: United Kickers
1999  Not known
2000: Rangers
2001: Rangers
2002–03: Rangers
2003–04: Rangers
2004–05: Rangers
2005: Hairoun Stars
2006: Rangers
2007: Rangers
2008: Hairoun Stars
2009: no competition

Football competitions in the British Virgin Islands